This is a list of episodes of the 3D animated short TV show, Bernard also known as Backkom.

Series overview

Episodes

Season 1 (2005–06)

Season 2 (2008–09)

Season 3 (2009–10)

Season 4 (2010–11)

Season 5 (2011–12)

Film (2007)

Bernard (TV shorts)
Bernard (TV shorts)
Bernard (TV shorts)
Bernard (TV shorts)